Ocnerioxyna gracilis is a species of tephritid or fruit flies in the genus Ocnerioxyna of the family Tephritidae.

Distribution
Malawi, South Africa.

References

Tephritinae
Insects described in 1861
Diptera of Africa